Gamasellus yastrebtsovi is a species of mite in the family Ologamasidae.

References

yastrebtsovi
Articles created by Qbugbot
Animals described in 1993